This list of Buddhism by country shows the distribution of the Buddhist religion, practiced by about 535 million people as of the 2010s, representing 7% to 8% of the world's total population.

Buddhism is the dominant religion in Bhutan, Myanmar, Cambodia, Mainland China, Hong Kong, Japan, Tibet, Laos, Macau, Mongolia, Singapore, Sri Lanka, Taiwan, Thailand, Kalmykia and Vietnam. Large Buddhist populations live in North Korea, Nepal, India and South Korea. China is the country with the largest population of Buddhists, approximately 244 million or 18.2% of its total population. They are mostly followers of Chinese schools of Mahayana, making this the largest body of Buddhist traditions.

Mahayana, also practised in broader East Asia, is followed by over half of the world's Buddhists. The second largest body of Buddhist schools is Theravada, mostly followed in Southeast Asia and Sri Lanka. The third largest body of schools Vajrayana, is followed mostly in Tibet, Bhutan,  Nepal, Mongolia and parts of Russia, but is disseminated throughout the world. The fourth largest body of Buddhist schools is Navayana, mostly followed in Maharashtra, India.

By country

By region

Ten countries with the largest Buddhist populations

See also

Neo-Confucianism
East Asian Buddhism
Buddhism and Eastern religions

Other religions:
Hinduism by country
Sikhism by country
Christianity by country
Islam by country
Judaism by country
Baháʼí Faith by country

General:
List of religious populations
Religions by country

References

External links
 The US State Department's International Religious Freedom Report 2010
 CIA FactBook 
 adherents.com